The Pumpherston retort (also known as the Bryson retort) was a type of oil-shale retort used in Scotland at the end of 19th and beginning of 20th century.  It marked separation of the oil-shale industry from the coal industry as it was designed specifically for oil-shale retorting.  The retort is named after Pumpherston town in Scotland, which was one of the major Scottish oil shale areas. The retort was commercialized by Pumpherston Oil Company.

History 
The Pumpherston retort  was invented and patented in 1894 by William Fraser, James Bryson, and  James Jones of Pumpherston Oil Company.  By 1910, 1,528 Pumpherston retorts were used in Scotland.  In addition, the retort was used in Spain and Australia. At Newnes, in Australia, the Pumpherson design was used, but it was later modified—by adding more off-takes—to make it better suited to oil-rich shale, by John Fell. The resulting design variant was patented by Fell, and was referred to as a 'modified Pumpherson' or 'Fell' retort. That modified design was also used at Glen Davis.

Design
The upper section was made of iron and the lower section was made of fire bricks. The raw oil shale was fed on the top of retort.

The retort had a 15 ton capacity, and the residence time was 24 hours. It was started up by combustion of coal, but after the process started it was switched to the produced oil shale gas.

References

Oil shale technology
Energy in Scotland
Industrial history of Scotland
1894 introductions
1894 establishments in Scotland
History of West Lothian
Economy of West Lothian